Samuel D. Schwarz (5 March 1814 – 11 March 1868) was a Swiss politician and President of the Swiss Council of States (1855/1856).

External links 

1814 births
1868 deaths
People from Brugg District
Swiss Calvinist and Reformed Christians
Members of the Council of States (Switzerland)
Presidents of the Council of States (Switzerland)
Members of the National Council (Switzerland)